The Tsomo River is a river in the Eastern Cape Province of South Africa. It is a tributary of the Great Kei River.

Course
It originates about 10 km to the north west of the town Elliot and flows southward to meet the right-hand bank of the Great Kei River.  
Towns lying on the banks of the Tsomo River include: Tsomo, Cala and Ncora The first chief to settle in Tsomo was Chief Jantjie ka Gcingca.

Dams on the Tsomo River 
 Ncora Dam

See also 
 List of rivers of South Africa

References 

Rivers of the Eastern Cape